Orthetrum borneense is a freshwater dragonfly species, native to Sarawak region in Malaysia. It is only known from 10 type species collected on Mount Dulit. Due to massive deforestation, the only information about its habitat is a supposition that it breeds in forest pools.

See also 
 Orthetrum

References 

Libellulidae
Insects described in 1936
Insects of Malaysia